Prem Singh Tamang (born 5 February 1968), better known as P. S. Golay, is an Indian politician and the current Chief Minister of Sikkim and founding leader of the Sikkim Krantikari Morcha (SKM). Before forming the party, he was a key member of the Sikkim Democratic Front (SDF) Party.

Personal life  
Tamang was born on 5 February 1968 in the Indian Gorkha family of Kalu Singh Tamang and Dhan Maya Tamang. He hails from Singling Busty, West Sikkim. He graduated with a degree in Bachelors of Arts from Darjeeling Government College in 1988. After graduation, he worked as a teacher in a state-run school. His son is politician Aditya Tamang, who is also a member of Sikkim Legislative Assembly from Soreng-Chakung.

Political career 
In 1990, he was appointed a graduate teacher under the HRD Department in the Government of Sikkim and served until 1993.

Due to his active interest in social work and politics, he resigned from government service and started participating in the political activities of SDF. As the SDF candidate in the Soreng-Chakung constituency, West Sikkim, he was elected to the Sikkim Legislative Assembly in 1994. During his affiliations with the SDF party, he served as State Youth Convenor and Vice President.

Sikkim government career 
He served in ministerial roles in the Sikkim government for three consecutive terms. From 1994 to 1999 as the Minister for Animal Husbandry, Ecclesiastical and Industry Department. From 1999 to 2004 as the Minister for Industries and Animal Husbandry. From 2004 to 2009 as the Minister for Building and Housing Department.

In 2009, after winning an election in the Burtuk Constituency, he was nominated as the Chairperson of Industries Department. However, he did not serve as chairperson. After establishment of his party Sikkim Krantikari Morcha, during 2014 he was elected as MLA from Burtuk Constituency.

Sikkim Krantikari Morcha party 
Golay became a dissident MLA of the SDF party after the Rolu Picnic event that was conducted by employees of Sikkim on 21 December 2009. The ruling party called a show-cause notice to the government workers who attended the Rolu Picnic.

Following this incident, Golay decided to found the Sikkim Krantikari Morcha, which opposed the SDF, on 4 February 2013 in Soreng, West Sikkim. On 6 September 2013 he officially resigned from all SDF party duties and became the president of the SKM party. During the election of 2014, the party gained ten of thirty-two seats in the Sikkim State Legislative Assembly under the leadership of Golay. Overall, in the 2014 election, Golay's party shared 42% of total votes in Sikkim.

On 13 January 2017, he was disqualified from the Sikkim Legislative Assembly after being convicted on 28 December 2016 for misappropriating government funds while with the SDF between 1994 and 1999. In 2017, he became the main opposition leader of Sikkim, serving as a president of Sikkim Krantikari Morcha. During his release after conviction on 10 August 2018 witnessed massive gathering which is counted as highest ever gathering of any political event of Sikkim.

Chief Minister of Sikkim
Golay led the Sikkim Krantikari Morcha to victory in 2019 assembly elections winning 17 out of 32 seats in the legislative assembly which eventually ended the 24-year rule of the Pawan Kumar Chamling led Sikkim Democratic Front. On 24 May 2019, SKM spokesperson Jacob Khaling said Golay will head the government in the state however, according to constitutional experts, his conviction under the Prevention of Corruption Act might be a hindrance for him becoming the Chief Minister of Sikkim.

On 27 May 2019, Golay, who did not contest the legislative assembly polls, was sworn in the 6th Chief Minister of the state of Sikkim. Golay won from Poklok-Kamrang in the by-election with 10,811 votes, securing 84% of the total vote share.

Electoral records 
 Sikkim Legislative Assembly election

See also 

 Prem Singh Tamang ministry

References

1968 births
Living people
Chief Ministers of Sikkim
Sikkim Democratic Front politicians
Sikkim Krantikari Morcha politicians
People from Gyalshing district
Indian Gorkhas
Tamang people
University of North Bengal alumni
Sikkim MLAs 2019–2024